John Michael Moates (November 28, 1944 – July 9, 2018) was an American basketball player best known for his collegiate career at the University of Richmond between 1964–65 and 1966–67. A native of Richmond, Virginia, the  point guard played for the Spiders for three seasons, the last two of which he was a First Team All-Southern Conference selection. In his senior season of 1966–67, Moates averaged 25.0 points per game to lead the conference in scoring and was subsequently named the Southern Conference Player of the Year.

In the 1967 NBA draft, the Cincinnati Royals selected him in the third round (138th overall) but he never played in a game in the league.

Moates became a businessman in his later life. He died on July 9, 2018 following a brief illness.

References

1944 births
2018 deaths
American men's basketball players
Basketball players from Richmond, Virginia
Cincinnati Royals draft picks
Point guards
Richmond Spiders men's basketball players